Shimeket Gugesa Beshah (born 1 January 1995) is an Ethiopian professional footballer who plays as an attacking midfielder for Ethiopian Premier League club Fasil Kenema and the Ethiopia national team.

Career
Gugesa began his career with Hawassa City, before moving to Dedebit in 2013. In 2018, he transferred to Fasil Kenema, signing an extension with the club on 1 October 2020.

International career
Gugesa made his international debut with the Ethiopia national team in a 0–0 tie with Kenya in the 2013 CECAFA Cup on 27 November 2013.

Honours
Dedebit
Ethiopian Cup: 2014

Fasil Kenema
Ethiopian Premier League: 2020–21

References

External links
 

1995 births
Living people
Sportspeople from Addis Ababa
Ethiopian footballers
Ethiopia international footballers
Ethiopian Premier League players
Association football midfielders
2021 Africa Cup of Nations players